Slavko Goluža (born 17 September 1971) is a retired Croatian handball player and current coach of RK Zagreb.

Club career
Goluža was born in the village of Pješivac-Kula near Stolac. He began his career with RK Mehanika Metković. At the age of 18, he moved to RK Zagreb-Chromos, with which he won two consecutive European Cups in 1992 and 1993.

He won the EHF Cup with RK Metković Jambo in 2000 and the year later the club reached the final again.

Goluža also played in Germany for TuS Nettelstedt-Lübbecke, in France for Paris Saint-Germain and in Hungary for Fotex Veszprém.

International career
He was a member of the Croatian national team that won Olympic gold medals twice: at the 1996 and 2004 Summer Olympics. For over a decade he participated in all medals that Croatia had won at the World Championships (gold in 2003, silver in 1995 and 2005), and at the European Championship (bronze in 1994).

Coaching career
Goluža worked as an assistant coach with the Croatian national team between 2006 and 2010 under the coaching staff of the head coach Lino Červar. He also worked as head coach for RK Siscia once and for RK CO Zagreb in two terms. 

In September 2010, Goluža succeeded Červar as the head coach of the Croatian national team, guiding Croatia to the bronze medals at the 2012 European Championship, 2012 Summer Olympics and at the 2013 World Championship. In February 2015, following Croatia's surprisingly unsuccessful World Championship in Qatar, he left the bench and was replaced by his assistant Željko Babić. 

In April 2017, Goluža became the head coach for HT Tatran Prešov.

Personal life
Goluža is a supporter of the centre-right Croatian Democratic Union (HDZ). He was married Iva Goluža, with whom he has a son Ivan. The couple got divorced after 11 years of marriage, in 2013.

Honours

Player
RK Zagreb
Croatian First League (9): 1991–92, 1992–93, 1993–94, 1994–95, 1995–96, 1996–97, 1997–98, 2004–05, 2005–06
Croatian Cup (9): 1992, 1993, 1994, 1995, 1996, 1997, 1998, 2005, 2006
Yugoslav First League (1): 1990–91
EHF Champions League (2): 1991–92, 1992–93
European Supercup (1): 1993

RK Metković Jambo 
Croatian Cup (2): 2001, 2002
EHF Cup (1): 2000

Fotex Veszprém
Hungarian Premier League (1): 2003–04
Magyar Kupa (1): 2004

Head coach
RK Zagreb
Croatian First League (2): 2012–13, 2016–17
Croatian Cup (2): 2013, 2017

Croatia
Summer Olympics third place: 2012
World Championship third place: 2013 
European Championship third place: 2012
Mediterranean Games runner-up: 2013

Individual
Franjo Bučar State Award for Sport: 1996, 2004, 2009
Best Croatian handballer by Sportske novosti & HRS: 2001
Trophy MOO for sports and promoting optimism: 2007
Best Croatian handball coach by Sportske novosti & CHF: 2012, 2013, 2014

Orders
 Order of Danica Hrvatska with face of Franjo Bučar – 1995
 Order of Duke Trpimir with Neck Badge and Morning Star – 1996

References

External links
 
 
 
 

1971 births
Living people
People from Stolac
Croats of Bosnia and Herzegovina
Croatian male handball players
Olympic handball players of Croatia
Olympic gold medalists for Croatia
Handball players at the 1996 Summer Olympics
Handball players at the 2004 Summer Olympics
Olympic medalists in handball
Croatian handball coaches
Medalists at the 2004 Summer Olympics
Medalists at the 2012 Summer Olympics
Medalists at the 1996 Summer Olympics
Olympic bronze medalists for Croatia
RK Zagreb players
RK Zagreb coaches
Mediterranean Games gold medalists for Croatia
Competitors at the 1993 Mediterranean Games
Competitors at the 2001 Mediterranean Games
Mediterranean Games medalists in handball